The NESCAC baseball tournament is the conference tournament in baseball for the New England Small College Athletic Conference (NESCAC). It is a best-of-three series followed by a double-elimination tournament and seeding is based on regular-season records. The winner receives the conference's automatic bid to the NCAA Division III baseball tournament.

Tournament
The NESCAC Baseball tournament is a best-of-three series followed by a double-elimination tournament held each year at rotating campus sites.  Eight of the ten NESCAC teams qualify for the tournament.  The winner earns the NESCAC's guaranteed bid to the NCAA Tournament.

History
Until 2022, the Conference Tournament featured four teams in a double-elimination tournament. There was no tournament in 2020 due to the COVID-19 pandemic. Due to a shortened 2021 season, a championship series was held between the top team of each division. In 2022, a new format was unveiled, which would feature the top four teams of each division qualifying for the NESCAC tournament. A best-of-three series will be played in the quarterfinal round. Then, a double-elimination tournament will be played between the final four teams.

Results

TBD: to be determined
Notes

Teams reaching the top four

* hosts

Overall team records

See also
 NESCAC men's basketball tournament
 NESCAC men's ice hockey tournament

References

College baseball conference tournaments in the United States
Tournament
Recurring sporting events established in 2001